Actias australovietnama is a moth in the family Saturniidae. It is found in Vietnam.

References

Australovietnama
Moths described in 2000
Moths of Asia